Joanne Elizabeth Calvino (born ) is a British female weightlifter, competing in the 48 kg category and representing England or Great Britain at international competitions. She competed at world championships, most recently at the 2011 World Weightlifting Championships.

Major results

References

1980 births
Living people
British female weightlifters
Place of birth missing (living people)
Weightlifters at the 2006 Commonwealth Games
Weightlifters at the 2010 Commonwealth Games
Weightlifters at the 2014 Commonwealth Games
Commonwealth Games competitors for England